The Movement for the Defence of the Land (Catalan: Moviment de Defensa de la Terra, MDT) was the united front of the socialist independence organisations of the Catalan Countries; specifically the Socialist Party of National Liberation (PSAN), Independentists of the Catalan Countries (IPC). In 1986 the movement split in two sectors: the MDT-PSAN and the MDT-IPC. In 1991 the Communist Party of the Valencians (PCV) joined the MDT. The MDT dissolved itself in 2014, and formed a new party: Poble Lliure.

References

Political parties in Catalonia
Political parties established in 1984
Catalan independence movement
Socialist parties in Catalonia
Communist parties in Catalonia
Communist parties in Spain